Wirecutter (formerly known as The Wirecutter) is a product review website owned by The New York Times Company. It was founded by Brian Lam in 2011 and purchased by The New York Times Company in 2016 for about $30 million.

Approach and business model

The site focuses on writing detailed guides to different categories of consumer products which recommend just one or two best items in the category. It earns most of its revenue from affiliate marketing by including links to its recommendations. To prevent bias, the staff who write its reviews are not informed about what commissions, if any, the site receives for different products. Due to affiliate revenue, the site is less reliant than other blogs and news sites on advertising revenue, although the Wirecutter site has displayed banner ads in the past.

Wirecutter has partnered with other websites including Engadget (as of 2015) to provide guest posts sponsored by the company. In 2015, Amazon tested a partnership with Wirecutter on a similar sponsored posts format on Amazon's site for recommendations. While Wirecutter does perform their own testing of products, they also draw on and cite other reviews by sites like Ravingtechnology, Topyten, Consumer Reports, Reviewed, CNET, and America's Test Kitchen, often using those reviews to filter a large range of products on the market down to a small number of candidates for testing.

History
Brian Lam founded the site in 2011 after leaving the editor-in-chief position at Gizmodo. It was originally part of The Awl. In the five years from its launch in 2011 to 2016, the company generated $150 million in revenue from affiliate programs with its merchant partners. A sibling site called The Sweethome was started in 2013 and focused on home goods while The Wirecutter itself focused on electronics and tools. After forming an editorial partnership with The New York Times in 2015, The Wirecutter was acquired by the Times in October 2016 for a reported $30 million. Ben French spearheaded the acquisition, recalling "The first day I ever met [Brian Lam], after spending an hour or two with him, I was like, 'We should buy you. I want to work with you.' For me, it was love at first sight." The Wirecutter and Sweethome were combined into a single site in 2017, a year after the Times acquisition.

Lam announced he had hired Jacqui Cheng as editor-in-chief for The Wirecutter in December 2013. After the Times acquisition, David Perpich was appointed to President and General Manager of The Wirecutter in March 2017. When Cheng stepped down in September 2018, the staff had grown from under 10 to over 100 employees. Ben Frumin succeeded Cheng in December 2018. The Wirecutter Union was formed in 2019 with approximately 65 employees, affiliated with NewsGuild-CWA of New York. By 2020, Wirecutter had approximately 150 employees, with the majority working remotely away from the headquarters in Long Island City.

In August 2021, the New York Times imposed a metered paywall on the site, no longer depending solely on affiliate marketing commissions for revenue. Later that year, Wirecutter staff went on strike, timed to coincide with the busy Black Friday shopping season in late November. The reporting structure of Wirecutter under Perpich was largely independent from the rest of the Times and the two pay scales were significantly different; Perpich was described as "disappointed" at the decision to strike.

Reception
Wirecutter has been described as a competitor to Consumer Reports, from which it differs by its explicit recommendations of top picks, a younger readership (with average age between 41 and 53 as of 2018), and its acceptance of vendor-supplied test units. Similar recommendation websites that compete with Wirecutter include Best Products (Hearst Communications, 2015), The Strategist (New York, 2016), BuzzFeed Reviews (BuzzFeed, 2018), and The Inventory (G/O Media, 2018).

The Wirecutter effect is described as a phenomenon "in which recommendations become so popular that they sell out".

References 

American review websites
The New York Times
Internet properties established in 2011